Lajos Schróth (born 28 August 1960) is a Hungarian retired professional footballer who played in Hungary for Újpesti Dózsa, in Spain for Cádiz CF and in Finland for FC Haka.

External links
Player profile at PlayerHistory.com 

1960 births
Living people
Hungarian footballers
Hungarian expatriate footballers
Nemzeti Bajnokság I players
La Liga players
Veikkausliiga players
Újpest FC players
Cádiz CF players
FC Haka players
Expatriate footballers in Spain
Expatriate footballers in Finland
Association football forwards
Nemzeti Bajnokság I managers
Hungarian football managers
Footballers from Budapest